The Men's 50 metre butterfly competition of the 2022 FINA World Swimming Championships (25 m) was held on 13 and 14 December 2022.

Records
Prior to the competition, the existing world and championship records were as follows.

The following new records were set during this competition:

Results

Heats
The heats were started on 13 December at 12:12.

Swim-off
The swim-off was held on 13 December at 13:33.

Semifinals
The semifinals were started on 13 December at 19:55.

Swim-off
The swim-off was held on 14 December at 10:55.

Final
The final was held on 14 December at 21:20.

References

Men's 50 metre butterfly